A  replacement depot in United States military terminology is a unit containing reserves or replacements for large front-line formations, such as field armies. As such, the term refers to formations similar to, but larger than, march battalions in other countries.  The slang term "repple depple" came into common use in the US Army during World War II. 

These depots were used by the US Army in the Pacific, North Africa, Italy, and Europe in World War II. They were efficient at continuously keeping fighting units at high numerical strength during prolonged combat when compared to the German system, but were found to be deleterious to morale as the men assigned from these large pools often had poor esprit de corps and were unfamiliar with the names, history, and traditions of the formations to which they were subsequently assigned. The handling of the replacements in a bulk, impersonal way by permanent depot staff tended to cause psychological trauma such that they were weakened by the experience. The Oxford English Dictionary notes, in a citation from The New York Times Magazine, 9 December 1945, that "repple depples, in short, are dreary places."

Locations

World War I
1st Replacement Depot, St Aignan, France: support for the American Expeditionary Forces (AEF).

World War II
Location of replacement depots in Europe c. January 1945.

After World War II
Location of replacement depots after World War II and the Cold War.

References

Military organization